The Men's Team event at the 2010 South American Games was held on March 22.

Medalists

Results

Main Bracket

Repechage

References
Report

Mteam
South American Games 2010